John Cannon (c. 1783 – February 19, 1833) was a businessman and political figure in Lower Canada.

He was born in St. John's in the Newfoundland Colony around 1783, the son of Edward Cannon (1739-1814), a master mason and Helena (Eleanor) Murphy, who had immigrated from Ireland around 1774. In 1795, he moved to the town of Quebec with his family; he apprenticed with his father beginning in 1800 and became a member of a company that included his father and brothers Ambrose and Laurence. John became head of the company as his father retired. After his brothers died, he became a master mason on his own. He served in the local militia. In 1824, he was elected to the Legislative Assembly of Lower Canada for Hampshire County; his election was declared invalid in 1826 after it was found that he had supplied alcohol to voters. Cannon was reelected in 1827.

He died at Quebec in 1833.

References

External links
 

1780s births
1833 deaths
John
Members of the Legislative Assembly of Lower Canada
Year of birth uncertain
Quebec people of Irish descent